A B-class lifeboat is any of a series of inflatable boats operated by the Royal National Lifeboat Institution (RNLI):

Boats in this series include:
 Atlantic 21-class lifeboat, the first generation RIB operated by the RNLI
 Atlantic 75-class lifeboat, the second generation RIB operated by the RNLI
 Atlantic 85-class lifeboat, the third generation & current production model RIB operated by the RNLI

Royal National Lifeboat Institution lifeboats
Ship classes